Dr. Rafael José Diaz (born April 22, 1955) is a Puerto Rican actor, singer and television host.

Biography

Early life 
Rafael was born in Manatí, Puerto Rico, where his father, a physician born in the Dominican Republic, was the medical director of the local hospital. His family eventually moved to Mayagüez in Western Puerto Rico where he grew up. While living in Mayagüez he sang and acted in various amateur radio and television broadcasts, as well as in high school talent shows. His reputation as a powerful singer followed him to San Juan, Puerto Rico, while attending medical school. His family supported his singing career on the condition that he finished the dentistry program at the University of Puerto Rico School of Dental Medicine. He interrupted his studies for close to eight years when his singing career took off, but eventually finished his degree and became a dentist (although he rarely practices his profession nowadays).

OTI Festival 
In 1978, he was selected by Telemundo to represent Puerto Rico in the seventh edition of the OTI Festival, which was held in Santiago, Chile. His song entitled "Háblame" (Talk to me), which was warmly received by the audience and by the international jurors gave him the fourth place.

In 1980, he won the ninth edition of the Festival OTI, in Buenos Aires, Argentina, with his interpretation of the song Contigo Mujer, which scored 36 points in the event and became an instant hit all over the Puerto Rican radio. The song was composed by singer Ednita Nazario (Who had represented Puerto Rico in the same festival the previous year) and Laureano Brizuela. Another radio hit was "Yo Quiero Hacerte Olvidar", the theme song for the telenovela "Martha Llorens".

New projects 
He soon began acting on television in various telenovelas and in 1983 became co-host of the Saturday night program A Millón, along with Héctor Marcano and Sonia Noemí on WAPA-TV. He proved to be a talented TV host and lasted there for various seasons. During this time, he and his then wife, actress Magali Carrasquillo, had a son, Juan Pablo.

In 1986, he joined Roberto Vigoreaux in hosting another WAPA-TV game show, Sabado En Grande, when A Millón was moved to Sunday nights. During this time, he also performed with Antonio Sánchez in the hit sitcoms El Cuartel de la Risa and Adultos Solteros. In the late 90s, he was hired as a television host by Univision in Miami, Florida.

José then became a recognizable face with Latino audiences in the United States with the movie showcase program Tu Pelicula. Later on he joined the morning show ¡Despierta América!, along with Fernando Arau, Ana María Canseco, Neyda Sandoval and fellow Puerto Rican Giselle Blondet. In 1998, Jose covered the 1998 Fifa World Cup as a commentator for Univision.

In 2005, he started hosting Univision-Puerto Rico's successful night show Anda Pa'l Cara.  At present, he is a co-host of the night program "Que Noche" on WIPR-TV in San Juan.

In 2013 he starred in the Puerto Rican premiere of Jerry Herman's La Cage Aux Folles as Albin/Zaza, opening in August 2013 at the Luis A Ferré Performing Arts Center in San Juan.

As of 2018, Jose is one of the show hosts and television reporters of variety show Lo Se Todo. His work there has caused wide reactions by the general public, including an open letter by a viewer that went viral on the internet, in which he was asked to leave the show.

See also
List of people from the Dominican Republic
List of Puerto Ricans

References

External links
 Fundacion Nacional para la Cultura Popular biography
  Rafael José on the Internet Movie Database

1955 births
Living people
American dentists
American television talk show hosts
People from Manatí, Puerto Rico
Puerto Rican comedians
20th-century Puerto Rican male singers
Puerto Rican male soap opera actors
Puerto Rican male stage actors
Puerto Rican people of Dominican Republic descent
Puerto Rican radio personalities
Puerto Rican television personalities
Association football commentators
People from Mayagüez, Puerto Rico